Restraint is a 2008 Australian thriller film, directed by David Denneen, written by Dave Warner and starring Stephen Moyer, Travis Fimmel and Teresa Palmer. The film was shot on location around New South Wales, Australia in mid-2005. Working titles during production were Ravenswood, Guests and Power Surge. It also features a cameo by Vanessa Redgrave. In the film, a couple of fugitives take an estate owner hostage, complicating their flight from justice.

Plot
Two fugitives from justice, Dale (Teresa Palmer) and Ron (Travis Fimmel), take hostage Andrew (Stephen Moyer), an agoraphobic art dealer who might have a dark past of his own.  All three soon find themselves participants in a game of survival.

Before the narrative begins, Ron has killed Dale's boss, the owner of a strip club. On the run, the couple kill a gas station attendant who sees the body in the trunk of their car.  Stumbling across Andrew's magnificent country estate, the couple plan to hide out there until the search for them abates.  Ron, impulsive and out of control, abuses and threatens to kill Andrew, but Dale intervenes.  Andrew proposes to give them AU 40,000 dollars and valuable jewelry to aid their getaway. Someone, though, must go to the bank to retrieve the goods. Andrew suggests Dale do it, posing as his fiancée, Gabrielle. Dale, as Gabrielle, drives to town and twice enters the bank without creating suspicion.

While Dale is gone, Andrew tells Ron that Gabrielle had left him after having an affair with his father and being paid by him to leave; he subsequently hired a hit man to kill his father.  To persuade Ron to leave him alive, he offers leverage in the form of a photo that proves he had his father killed.  While allegedly retrieving the photo, Andrew manages to lock Ron in the cellar, but Ron escapes and regains the upper hand.

Dale returns and the couple prepare to leave.  Ron again makes a move to kill Andrew; Dale, who has been partly seduced by Andrew and his way of life, grabs their shotgun and shoots at Ron, without realizing that he has left the gun unloaded.  Ron knocks Dale out and leaves her in a locked car filling with exhaust, sadistically goading Andrew into braving his agoraphobia in order to save her.  Andrew manages to save her and wound Ron; reviving, Dale deals Ron a death blow.

With Ron dead, Andrew moves to call the police.  Dale stops him by re-assuming her pose as Gabrielle, and, prompted by Andrew, by telling him in Gabrielle's voice that she loves him. They have sex—again, with Dale coached to speak in Gabrielle's voice.  Afterwards, Dale asks Andrew what would happen if Gabrielle came back while she's impersonating her. Andrew assures her Gabrielle is "gone", as we see him burning Gabrielle's passport, ambiguously suggesting he actually killed her. Later, Andrew plays Wagner downstairs alone and seems to celebrate, while Dale gazes forlornly out the house's top-floor window.

Cast
 Teresa Palmer as Dale
 Travis Fimmel as Ronald 'Ron' Jason Beron
 Stephen Moyer as Andrew Shepard
 Philip Holder as Sergeant Paul Wittens
 Margie McCrae as Mrs. Wynott
 Peter Davies as Terry Gilmore
 Alyssa McClelland as Gabrielle
 Nate Jones as Tim
 Joanne Hunt as Constable Edwina Blainey

Production
Over half the budget came from the Film Finance Corporation. The film was shot in late 2005 near Goulburn and Camden in New South Wales, originally using the title Guests, then Ravenswood. Stephen Moyer was imported from the United Kingdom to support his two Australian co-stars.

Release
The film was originally meant to be released in May 2006 by Accent Entertainment. Multiple test screenings resulted in the film's running time being reduced from 120 to 90 minutes, and the ending being changed to something more ambiguous. It eventually screened in one cinema in Sydney in April 2009.

References

External links
 
 
 Tsuki's publicity site for Ravenswood
Ravenswood at the National Film and Sound Archive

2008 films
2008 thriller films
Australian thriller films
2000s English-language films